Hans Lennart Andersson-Tvilling (born 15 July 1928) is a Swedish former ice hockey player and footballer. He competed at the 1952 and 1956 Winter Olympics, winning a bronze medal in 1952 and finishing fourth in 1956 alongside his twin brother Stig. In addition to hockey, he also played four international matches for the Swedish association football team.

Honours

Club 

 Djurgårdens IF 
 Division 2 Nordöstra (1): 1948–49
 Allsvenskan: 1954–55

References

External links 
 

1928 births
Living people
Djurgårdens IF Hockey players
Ice hockey players at the 1952 Winter Olympics
Ice hockey players at the 1956 Winter Olympics
Olympic bronze medalists for Sweden
Olympic ice hockey players of Sweden
Olympic medalists in ice hockey
Sportspeople from Stockholm
Swedish ice hockey forwards
Swedish twins
Twin sportspeople
Medalists at the 1952 Winter Olympics
Swedish footballers
Sweden international footballers
Djurgårdens IF Fotboll players
Sundbybergs IK players
Allsvenskan players
Association football forwards